Shooting at the 2018 Asian Games was held at the Jakabaring Shooting Range, Palembang, Indonesia. It was held from 19 to 26 August 2018.

Dispatched the highest number of athletes, China won the most medals with 15, as well as most gold and silver medals. Japan won the most bronze medals. Hosts Indonesia, despite playing with the second-highest number of athletes, failed to win any gold or bronze; they won only one silver medal.

Schedule

Medalists

Men

Women

Mixed

Medal table

Participating nations
A total of 390 athletes from 33 nations competed in shooting at the 2018 Asian Games:

References

External links
Shooting at the 2018 Asian Games

 
2018 Asian Games events
2018 Asian Games
2018
Asian Games